Maurice Isserman (born 1951), formerly William R. Kenan and the James L. Ferguson chairs, is a long-time Professor of History at Hamilton College and important contributor to the "new history of American communism" that reinterpreted the role of the Communist Party USA during the Popular Front period of the 1930s and 1940s. His books have also traced the emergence of the New Left and the 1960s. He co-authored a biography of Dorothy Ray Healey and wrote an award-winning biography of the American socialist leader Michael Harrington.  Recently, he refocused his work on the history of mountaineering in the Himalayas and the United States. He has contributed editorials and book reviews to The New York Times, The Boston Globe, Newsday, the Los Angeles Times, The Nation, and The American Alpine Review.

Early life
Isserman was born in Hartford, Connecticut, on March 12, 1951, into a family that would have significant influence on his political and intellectual future. His mother, born Flora Huffman, was the daughter and sister of Quaker ministers, graduated from a Quaker college, and was a social worker for Connecticut. His father, Jacob (Jack) Isserman, was born in Antwerp and came with his family to the US in 1906 at four; later naturalized as a US citizen, he was a machinist who worked at the Pratt and Whitney aircraft factory in East Hartford, Connecticut.

The Issermans were Jewish; Maurice's uncle, Ferdinand Isserman, was a prominent rabbi in St. Louis, Missouri. Another uncle, lawyer Abraham J. Isserman, was member of the International Juridical Association (1931), founding member of the National Lawyers Guild (1937), and member of the American Civil Liberties Union and was also one of the lawyers in the first Smith Act trial in 1949 during which he was cited for contempt and then imprisoned afterwards and disbarred. He also argued for the petitioners in Dennis v. United States.

Isserman's parents had divorced in 1959, and his mother remarried Walter Snow, a local newspaper reporter who had been a Communist in the 1930s, a minor figure on the literary left (John Reed Club member, and the editor of The Anvil, a Midwestern radical literary magazine). They lived in the small town of Coventry, Connecticut, and Isserman graduated from Coventry High School in 1968.

After his father's death in 1963, Maurice became close to his uncle Abraham, who took him to one of his first demonstrations, the 1967 March on the Pentagon.

Education

In the fall of 1968, Isserman enrolled in Reed College in Portland, Oregon, where he joined the campus chapter of Students for a Democratic Society and took part in antiwar protests and other New Left activism. In the spring of 1970, following the US invasion of Cambodia and the Kent State University strike, he dropped out of Reed College and joined the Portland Revolutionary Youth Movement (PRYM) collective. PRYM members were involved in antiwar activities in a local underground newspaper, The Willamette Bridge, and in the local food co-op. After a couple of years, PRYM disbanded, and Isserman returned to Reed to finish his undergraduate degree. He wrote a senior thesis on the history of radical American writers in the 1930s and worked on another underground newspaper, The Portland Scribe. He graduated with a BA in history in 1973 and stayed on another year, working evenings as a proofreader for The Oregonian and days (unpaid) for The Portland Scribe.

In August 1974, Isserman began graduate work in history at the University of Rochester, working closely with Eugene Genovese and Christopher Lasch. He received his MA in American history in 1976 and his PhD in 1979. His dissertation was a history of American communism during the Second World War, which became his first published book, Which Side Were You On? in 1982.

Academic career

After completing his dissertation, Isserman began the itinerant career of the young scholar. His first job was a replacement position for a semester at Oberlin College in fall 1979, followed by replacement positions at Hobart and William Smith Colleges and then back to Oberlin. He settled into Smith College from 1982 to 1988, followed by temporary positions at Mount Holyoke College and Williams College.

During this period, a debate broke out over the character of American communism, and Isserman's book was one of several criticized by Theodore Draper's two-part attack on the "new history of American Communism" in The New York Review of Books. As the debate heated up, Isserman criticized books by Draper's protégé, Harvey Klehr. Isserman returned to the theme with a chapter on the history of the CPUSA's "destalinization crisis" in his second book on the emergence of the New Left, If I Had a Hammer in 1987, and in his co-authored work with Healey, Dorothy Healey Remembers, in 1990 (reissued in paperback as California Red).

Isserman secured a tenure-track position at Hamilton College in 1990, and has remained there since, currently as the James L. Ferguson Professor of History. After the debate over American communism, Isserman shifted his focus to the history of conflicts between left and right during the 1960s in his book with Michael Kazin, America Divided: The Civil War of the 1960s, now in its third edition. He wrote a prize-winning biography of America's best known socialist of his time, Michael Harrington, leader of the Democratic Socialists of America. Acknowledging the archival revelations following the fall of the Soviet Union, Isserman has credited Klehr and his coauthors with adding an important chapter on espionage to the history of the Communist Party USA.

Isserman has also criticized the new Students for a Democratic Society for romanticizing the leadership of the Weatherman faction of the old SDS. In recent years, Isserman has turned to his love of mountaineering to find a fresh focus for his work and wrote Fallen Giants: The History of Himalayan Mountaineering with Stewart Weaver, acclaimed as the "authoritative history" of the subject, and Continental Divide: A History of American Mountaineering, about mountaineering in the United States. He is also writing a history of Hamilton College for its bicentennial in 2012.

Isserman has participated in an exchange at the University of Sussex in fall 1985, a Mellon fellowship at Harvard University, 1992–1993, a Fulbright Distinguished Professorship at the University of Moscow, spring 1997, and an exchange at Pembroke College, Oxford University, fall 2001.

Personal

In his 1993 book Which Side Were You On?, Isserman defines "communazi" as an American political neologism, "coined by a reporter" that conflates both Communism and Nazism as the same because they were essentially totalitarian, whether left or right in belief.

Isserman pursues a passion for mountain-climbing, about which he has written the award-winning book Fallen Giants.

He is married and has two children.

Awards

 2008: National Outdoor Book Award, Fallen Giants (with Stewart Weaver).

Works

Books
 Isserman, Maurice. (1982) Which Side Were You On? The American Communist Party during the Second World War. 
 Isserman, Maurice. (1987). If I Had a Hammer... The Death of the Old Left and the Birth of the New Left.  
 Isserman, Maurice & Healey Dorothy. (1990). Dorothy Healey Remembers: A Life in the American Communist Party.  
Reprinted as California Red: A Life in the American Communist Party (1993). 
Isserman, Maurice & Bowman, John Stewart. (1992). America at War: The Korean War. 
Isserman, Maurice. (1995). Witness to War: Vietnam. 
Isserman, Maurice. (1997). Journey to Freedom: The African American Great Migration. 
 Isserman, Maurice & Kazin, Michael. (2000). America Divided: The Civil War of the 1960s. 
 Isserman, Maurice. (2000).The Other American: The Life of Michael Harrington. 
Isserman, Maurice & Bowman, John. (2005). Exploring North America, 1800-1900. 
 Isserman, Maurice & Weaver, Stewart. (2008). Fallen Giants: The History of Himalayan Mountaineering from the Age of Empire to the Age of Extremes. 
Isserman, Maurice & Bowman, John Stewart. (2010). America at War: World War II. 
Isserman, Maurice; Kenan, William R.; & Bowman, John Stewart. (2010). America at War: Vietnam War. 
Isserman, Maurice & Bowman, John Stewart. (2010). Across America: The Lewis And Clark Expedition. 
Isserman, Maurice. (2012). On The Hill: A Bicentennial History of Hamilton College. 
Cronkite, Walter & Isserman, Maurice. (2013). Cronkite's War: His World War II Letters Home. 
 Isserman, Maurice. (2016). Continental Divide: A History of American Mountaineering. 
Isserman, Maurice. (2019). The Winter Army: The World War II Odyssey of the 10th Mountain Division, America's Elite Alpine Warriors.

Articles

On October 20, 2017, Isserman contributed to "Red Century," a New York Times centenary series about the Bolshevik Revolution, with the article "When New York City Was the Capital of American Communism."
 "How Old is the New SDS?" The Chronicle of Higher Education (October 19, 2007)
 "The Flower in the Gun Barrel," The Chronicle of Higher Education (October 19, 2007)
 "3 Days of Peace and Music, 40 Years of Memory," The Chronicle of Higher Education (October 19, 2007)
 "When New York City Was the Capital of American Communism," New York Times "Red Century" series (October 20, 2017)

See also
 Historians of American Communism

Notes

External links 
 Maurice Isserman's Homepage at Hamilton College
 Interview with Maurice Isserman by Stephen McKiernan, Binghamton University Libraries Center for the Study of the 1960s

Hamilton College (New York) faculty
Living people
American biographers
American male biographers
21st-century American historians
21st-century American male writers
1951 births
Reed College alumni
University of Rochester alumni
Members of Students for a Democratic Society
Historians of communism
The Oregonian people
Historians from New York (state)
American male non-fiction writers